The 1989 Pepsi Canadian Junior Curling Championships were held at the Heather Curling Club in Winnipeg, Manitoba.

Men's

Teams

Standings

Results

Draw 1

Draw 2

Draw 3

Draw 5

Draw 8

Draw 10

Draw 11

Draw 13

Draw 15

Draw 16

Draw 17

Draw 18

Draw 19

Draw 20

Draw 21

Draw 22

Tiebreakers

Playoffs

Semifinal

Final

Women's

Teams

Standings

Results

Draw 1

Draw 2

Draw 4

Draw 6

Draw 7

Draw 9

Draw 12

Draw 14

Draw 15

Draw 16

Draw 17

Draw 18

Draw 19

Draw 20

Draw 21

Draw 22

Playoffs

Semifinal

Final

External links
Men's statistics
Women's statistics

Canadian Junior Curling Championships
Curling competitions in Winnipeg
Canadian Junior Curling Championships
1989 in Manitoba